Walnut Creek is a stream in Fremont, Page, Montgomery, Mills, Pottawattamie and Shelby counties in Iowa. It is a tributary of the East Nishnabotna River.

Walnut Creek is named after the groves of black walnut surrounding it.

See also
List of rivers of Iowa

References

Rivers of Fremont County, Iowa
Rivers of Mills County, Iowa
Rivers of Montgomery County, Iowa
Rivers of Page County, Iowa
Rivers of Pottawattamie County, Iowa
Rivers of Shelby County, Iowa
Rivers of Iowa